Maysonet is a surname of French origin and a variant of the surname Maisonette also spelled Maisonet. Notable people with the surname include:

Edwin Maysonet (born 1981), Puerto Rican baseball player
Jorge Maysonet (born 1964), Puerto Rican boxer
Miguel Maysonet (born 1989), Puerto Rican football player
Cristian Maysonet (born 1990), Puerto Rican Flight Attendant